Hoshiarpur railway station is a main railway station in Hoshiarpur district, Punjab. Its code is HSX. It serves Hoshiarpur city. The station consists of one platform. The platform is not well sheltered. It lacks many facilities including water and sanitation. The station was constructed in 1905

Trains 

 Hoshiarpur–Jalandhar DMU
 Hoshiarpur–Amritsar DMU
 Hoshiarpur–Firozpur Cantt. DEMU
 Jalandhar City–Hoshiarpur DMU
 Delhi–Hoshiarpur Express
 Hoshiarpur–Jalandhar City Passenger

References

Railway stations in Hoshiarpur district
Firozpur railway division